Nadiad Junction (station code: ND) is a major railway station in the Kheda district of Gujarat State of India. It serves Nadiad city. It is under Vadodara railway division of Western Railway zone of Indian Railways. It is "A" category railway station of Western Railway Zone of Indian Railways. It has four platforms. Each day five train originate from Nadiad Junction.  Nadiad Junction handles more than 100 trains daily. If you wants to go to Modasa, Kapadvanj, Petlad and Bhadran you have to change the train from here. Indian Railways is decided to convert Nadiad-Bhadran Narrow Gauge Line to Broad Gauge line and Modasa line extend to Shamlaji.

History
Basically Structure of Nadiad Junction was built in 1945 but the First Railway line which is Nadiad to Bhadran (Narrow Gauge) was started in 1837 by Sayajirao Gaekwad. Also Nadiad to Kapadvanj a narrow gauge train was running but currently this line is converted to Broad Gauge.

Development
Indian Railways is going to develop a Multi Functional Complex at Nadiad Junction and Indian Railways is thinking to Create a New Railway line between Nadiad to Dholka and Nadiad - Mahemdavad - Kheda - Tarapur

Trains

Some of the trains that pass through Nadiad Junction are:

 12010/09 Shatabdi Express
 82901/02 Ahmedabad–Mumbai Central Tejas Express
 20947/48 Ahmedabad - Kevadia Jan Shatabdi Express
 20949/50 Ahmedabad - Kevadia Jan Shatabdi Express
 12941/42 Parasnath Express
 12971/72 Bandra Terminus–Bhavnagar Terminus Express
 22955/56 Kutch Express
 19217/18 Bandra Terminus–Jamnagar Saurashtra Janta Express
 12833/84 Howrah–Ahmedabad Superfast Express
 14707/08 Ranakpur Express
 22137/38 Prerana Express
 12215/16 Delhi Sarai Rohilla–Bandra Terminus Garib Rath Express
 19167/68 Sabarmati Express
 19165/66 Ahmedabad–Darbhanga Sabarmati Express
 22927/28 Lok Shakti Express
 19707/08 Amrapur Aravali Express
 12947/48 Azimabad Express
 22945/46 Saurashtra Mail
 19419/20 Chennai Central–Ahmedabad Express
 12917/18 Gujarat Sampark Kranti Express
 12901/02 Gujarat Mail
 12489/90 Bikaner–Dadar Superfast Express
 12959/60 Dadar–Bhuj Superfast Express
 16209/10 Mysore–Ajmer Express
 16507/08 Jodhpur–Bangalore City Express (via Hubballi)
 12989/90 Dadar–Ajmer Superfast Express
 19115/16 Sayajinagari Express
 12843/44 Puri–Ahmedabad Express
 11095/96 Ahimsa Express
 12931/32 Mumbai Central–Ahmedabad Double Decker Express
 11463/64 Somnath–Jabalpur Express (via Itarsi)
 11465/66 Somnath–Jabalpur Express (via Bina)
 19309/10 Shanti Express
 19215/16 Saurashtra Express
 22953/54 Gujarat Superfast Express
 12655/56 Navjeevan Express
 19033/34 Gujarat Queen
 17017/18 Rajkot–Secunderabad Express
 22959/60 Surat–Jamnagar Intercity Express
 12009/10 Mumbai Central–Ahmedabad Shatabdi Express
 12473/74 Gandhidham–Shri Mata Vaishno Devi Katra Sarvodaya Express
 16587/88 Yesvantpur–Bikaner Express
 19035/36 Vadodara–Ahmedabad Intercity Express
 12933/34 Karnavati Express

References

Railway stations in Kheda district
Vadodara railway division
Railway junction stations in Gujarat